Hartmann Bogumil (born 28 October 1938) is a German sailor. He competed in the Star event at the 1968 Summer Olympics.

References

External links
 

1938 births
Living people
German male sailors (sport)
Olympic sailors of East Germany
Sailors at the 1968 Summer Olympics – Star
People from Mrągowo